Heterophasia, the sibias, is a bird genus in the family Leiothrichidae.

Species
By some, the genus is considered monotypic, including only H. picaoides. However, seven species are commonly recognised:

 Rufous sibia, Heterophasia capistrata – sometimes in Malacias
 Grey sibia, Heterophasia gracilis – sometimes in Malacias
 Dark-backed sibia, Heterophasia melanoleuca – sometimes in Malacias
 Black-headed sibia or Desgodin's sibia, Heterophasia desgodinsi – sometimes in Malacias, formerly considered conspecific with H. melanoleuca
 White-eared sibia, Heterophasia auricularis – sometimes in Malacias
 Beautiful sibia, Heterophasia pulchella – sometimes in Malacias
 Long-tailed sibia, Heterophasia picaoides

References

 Collar, N. J. & Robson C. (2007). Family Picathartidae (Picathartes)  pp. 70 – 291 in; del Hoyo, J., Elliott, A. & Christie, D.A. eds. Handbook of the Birds of the World, Vol. 12. Picathartes to Tits and Chickadees. Lynx Edicions, Barcelona. 

 
Bird genera
Leiothrichidae
Taxa named by Edward Blyth
Taxonomy articles created by Polbot